The Lemnian language was spoken on the island of Lemnos, Greece, in the second half of the 6th century BC. It is mainly attested by an inscription found on a funerary stele, termed the Lemnos stele, discovered in 1885 near Kaminia. Fragments of inscriptions on local pottery show that it was spoken there by a community. In 2009, a newly discovered inscription was reported from the site of Hephaistia, the principal ancient city of Lemnos. Lemnian is largely accepted as being a Tyrsenian language, and as such related to Etruscan and Rhaetic. After the Athenians conquered the island in the latter half of the 6th century BC, Lemnian was replaced by Attic Greek.

Writing system
The Lemnian inscriptions are in Western Greek alphabet, also called "red alphabet". The red type is found in most parts of central and northern mainland Greece (Thessaly, Boeotia and most of the Peloponnese), as well as the island of Euboea, and in colonies associated with these places, including most colonies in Italy. The alphabet used for Lemnian inscriptions is similar to an archaic variant used to write the Etruscan language in southern Etruria.

Classification

A relationship between Lemnian, Rhaetic and Etruscan, as a Tyrsenian language family, has been proposed by German linguist Helmut Rix due to close connections in vocabulary and grammar. For example, 
 Both Etruscan and Lemnian share two unique dative cases, type-I *-si and type-II *-ale, shown both on the Lemnos Stele ('for Hulaie', 'for the Phocaean') and in inscriptions written in Etruscan ('to Aule', on the Cippus Perusinus; as well as the inscription , meaning 'I was blessed for Laris Velchaina');
 A few lexical correspondences have been noted, such as Lemnian  ('year') and Etruscan  (genitive case); or Lemnian  ('sixty') and Etruscan  (genitive case), both sharing the same internal structure "number + decade suffix + inflectional ending" (Lemnian: ši + alχvi + -s, Etruscan: še + alχl + s);

Rix's Tyrsenian family is supported by a number of linguists such as Stefan Schumacher, Carlo De Simone, Norbert Oettinger, Simona Marchesini, or Rex E. Wallace. Common features between Etruscan, Rhaetic, and Lemnian have been observed in morphology, phonology, and syntax. On the other hand, few lexical correspondences are documented, at least partly due to the scanty number of Rhaetic and Lemnian texts and possibly to the early date at which the languages split. The Tyrsenian family (or Common Tyrrhenic) is often considered to be Paleo-European and to predate the arrival of Indo-European languages in southern Europe.

According to Dutch historian Luuk De Ligt, the Lemnian language could have arrived in the Aegean Sea during the Late Bronze Age, when Mycenaean rulers recruited groups of mercenaries from Sicily, Sardinia and various parts of the Italian peninsula.

Scholars such as Norbert Oettinger, Michel Gras and Carlo De Simone think that Lemnian is the testimony of an Etruscan commercial settlement on the island that took place before 700 BC, not related to the Sea Peoples.

After more than 90 years of archaeological excavations at Lemnos, nothing has been found that would support a migration from Lemnos to Etruria or to the Alps where Rhaetic was spoken. The indigenous inhabitants of Lemnos, also called in ancient times Sinteis, were the Sintians, a Thracian population.

Vowels
Like Etruscan, the Lemnian language appears to have had a four-vowel system, consisting of "i", "e", "a" and "u". Other languages in the neighbourhood of the Lemnian area, namely Hittite and Akkadian, had similar four-vowel systems, suggesting early areal influence.

Lemnos Stele

The stele, also known as the stele of Kaminia, was found built into a church wall in Kaminia and is now at the National Archaeological Museum of Athens. The 6th century date is based on the fact that in 510 BC the Athenian Miltiades invaded Lemnos and Hellenized it. The stele bears a low-relief bust of a man and is inscribed in an alphabet similar to the western ("Chalcidian") Greek alphabet. The inscription is in Boustrophedon style, and has been transliterated but had not been successfully translated until serious linguistic analysis based on comparisons with Etruscan, combined with breakthroughs in Etruscan's own translation started to yield fruit.

The inscription consists of 198 characters forming 33 to 40 words, word separation sometimes indicated with one to three dots. The text on the front consists of three parts, two written vertically (1; 6-7) and one horizontally (2-5). Oddly, this text also contains a word  that seems to be connected to Etruscan  "nephew/uncle"; but this is a fairly clear borrowing from Latin nepot-, suggesting that the speakers of this language migrated at some point from the Italic peninsula (or independently borrowed this Indo-European word from somewhere else).

Transcription:
front:
A.1. 
A.2. 
A.3. 
A.4. 
A.5. 
A.6. 
A.7. 
side:
B.1. 
B.2. 
B.3.

Hephaistia inscription
Another Lemnian inscription was found during excavations at Hephaistia on the island of Lemnos in 2009. The inscription consists of 26 letters arranged in two lines of boustrophedonic script.

Transcription:
upper line (left to right):
 
lower line (right to left):

See also
 Tyrsenian languages
 Paleo-European languages

Notes

References

 Eichner, Heiner (2012) "Neues zur Sprache der Stele von Lemnos (Erster Teil)" Gorgias Press. Voprosy âzykovogo rodstva Vol.7 (1), p.9-32
 Eichner, Heiner (2013) "Neues zur Sprache der Stele von Lemnos (Zweiter Teil)" Gorgias Press. Voprosy âzykovogo rodstva Vol.10 (1), p.1-42.

External links
Development of the Etruscan Alphabet
A Gloss of the Lemnian Inscription
New Lemnian Inscription at R. Wallace' Rasenna blog
Etruscan Grammar
The Etruscan Texts Project (ETP)

Aegean languages in the Bronze Age
Ancient Lemnos
Archaic Greece
Extinct languages of Europe
Tyrsenian languages
Languages extinct in the 6th century BC